is a district located in Kumamoto Prefecture, Japan.

As of the Yatsushiro merger (but with 2003 population estimates), the district has an estimated population of 13,524 and a density of 406 persons per square kilometer. The total area is 33.29 km2.

Towns and villages
Hikawa

Mergers
See Merger and dissolution of municipalities of Japan.
On August 1, 2005, the municipalities of Izumi, Kagami, Sakamoto, Senchō and Tōyō merged into the city of Yatsushiro.
On October 1, 2005, the towns of Miyahara and Ryūhoku merged to form the new town of Hikawa.

Districts in Kumamoto Prefecture